Estadio Parque "Julio Pozzi" is a football stadium in Salto, Uruguay.  It is currently used mostly for football matches of Salto F.C. The stadium holds 6,000 spectators. It is part of a sports complex Complejo Deportivo Julio Pozzi, which consists of three football fields.

References

Parque Julio Pozzi
Sport in Salto, Uruguay